"Online" is a song by the Latvian rock group Brainstorm. The single appeared on the band's second international studio album Online (album) was released in 2001.

Track listing 
"Online" (radio edit)
"Online" (extended version)
"Visskumjākā parāde uz mūzu ielas" (live acoustic)

References 

2001 singles
Brainstorm (Latvian band) songs
2001 songs
EMI Records singles